Simon Watson-Taylor (1811 – 25 December 1902) was a British landowner in Wiltshire and Jamaica who briefly served as a Liberal Member of Parliament for Devizes between the 1857 election and that of 1859.

Early life
Watson-Taylor was the son of Jamaican planters George Watson-Taylor, later a Member of Parliament, and his wife Anna, a daughter of Sir John Taylor, 1st Baronet, of Vale Royal (the current Prime Ministerial mansion). His father used the wealth from their Jamaican plantations to acquire estates in Wiltshire, at Erlestoke, Coulston (including Baynton House), and Edington, along with a large art collection.

Jamaican interests
The Taylor (Tailzour before anglicisation) family – and Watson-Taylor's father, through his marriage – derived its wealth from sugar and slavery in the Colony of Jamaica. In 1852, Simon Watson-Taylor inherited Jamaican estates from his mother Anna. However, the vast majority of the wealth created by her great-uncle Simon Tailzour had been largely squandered by George Watson-Taylor. Watson-Taylor maintained a strong interest in the affairs of Jamaica and offered public support to Governor Edward John Eyre, after he brutally suppressed the Morant Bay rebellion of 1865. Watson-Taylor helped to found the Eyre Defence Fund, which aimed to vindicate the former governor as an imperial hero.

Family
On 30 June 1843 Watson-Taylor married Lady Hannah Charlotte Hay (1818–1887), one of the eight daughters of Field Marshal George Hay, 8th Marquess of Tweeddale (1787–1876), thus becoming a brother-in-law of the Duke of Wellington, the Marquess of Dalhousie, the Marquess of Tweeddale, George Hay, Earl of Gifford, Admiral of the Fleet Lord John Hay, General Sir Richard Taylor, and Sir Robert Peel, 3rd Baronet. There were four sons and seven daughters from their marriage.

Watson-Taylor lived at Urchfont Manor from about 1850 to 1862.

References

External links
 

1811 births
1902 deaths
Liberal Party (UK) MPs for English constituencies
UK MPs 1857–1859